Highway 265 is a provincial highway in the north-east region of Canadian province of Saskatchewan. It runs from Highway 120 to Highway 926.

Highway 265 is a major road through Candle Lake Provincial Park. Most of the section within the park lies on Candle Lake and it passes through Torch Lake, Waskateena Beach, and Tel-Win. Several campgrounds are also accessible from the highway.

References 

265